Parornix fagivora is a moth of the family Gracillariidae. It is found from Sweden to the Pyrenees, Italy and Albania and from Great Britain to southern Russia.

The wingspan is 11–14 mm.

The larvae feed on Fagus sylvatica, including subspecies Fagus sylvatica orientalis. They mine the leaves of their host plant. The mine starts as a small lower-surface epidermal corridor with reddish brown frass. Later, it becomes a small rectangular full depth blotch with black frass. The larva deposits only little silk in the mine, that remains practically flat. In the end, the larva leaves the mine and continues living freely under a folded leaf margin or leaf tip.

References

Parornix
Moths of Europe
Moths described in 1861